Liebler—Rohl Gasoline Station is a historic filling station located at Lancaster in Erie County, New York. It is the Village of Lancaster's sole example of historic 20th century roadside commercial architecture. It is in the Tudor Revival style of architecture. It operated as a gasoline station into the 1960s; currently it operates as a seasonal ice cream shop, known as Frosty's.

It was listed on the National Register of Historic Places in 1999.  It is located in the Broadway Historic District.

References

External links
Liebler--Rohl Gasoline Station - Lancaster, NY - U.S. National Register of Historic Places on Waymarking.com

Transport infrastructure completed in 1935
Transportation buildings and structures in Erie County, New York
Gas stations on the National Register of Historic Places in New York (state)
National Register of Historic Places in Erie County, New York
Historic district contributing properties in Erie County, New York